Glodeni may refer to several places in Romania:

Glodeni, a commune in Dâmbovița County
Glodeni, a commune in Mureș County
Glodeni, a village in Pucioasa town, Dâmbovița County
Glodeni, a village in Bălănești Commune, Gorj County
Glodeni, a village in Negrești town, Vaslui County

and in Moldova:

Glodeni, a city and the seat of Glodeni district